The 2005 Gran Premio Telmex/Tecate was the thirteenth and final race of the
2005 Bridgestone Presents the Champ Car World Series Powered by Ford season, held on November 6, 2005 at the Autódromo Hermanos Rodríguez in Mexico City, Mexico.  Justin Wilson swept both the pole and the race win.

Qualifying results

Race

Caution flags

Notes

 Average Speed 98.835 mph

Final championship standings

 Bold indicates the Season Champion.
Drivers' Championship standings

 Note: Only the top five positions are included.

External links
 Friday Qualifying Results
 Saturday Qualifying Results
 Race Results

Mexico City
Gran Premio Telmex Tecate
Gran Premio Tecate